Radek Dvořák (born March 9, 1977) is a Czech former professional ice hockey right winger. Dvořák was drafted in the first round of the 1995 NHL Entry Draft, tenth overall, by the Florida Panthers. A veteran of 1,260 NHL games, Radek has played for the Panthers, New York Rangers, Edmonton Oilers, St. Louis Blues, Atlanta Thrashers, Dallas Stars, Anaheim Ducks and the Carolina Hurricanes.

Playing career

Florida Panthers
Dvořák began his NHL career as an 18-year-old with the Florida Panthers in the 1995–96 season. In 77 games, Dvořák scored 13 goals and 27 points, as the Panthers reached the playoffs for the first time in club history. Dvořák helped the Panthers to the 1996 Stanley Cup Finals, earning four points in 16 games. He saw his numbers improve in his second season, scoring 18 goals and 39 points in 78 games to finish fourth in team scoring.  He missed 18 games during the 1997–98 NHL season, but still scored 12 goals and 24 assists for 36 points. In his fourth season, Dvořák played in every game, scoring 19 goals and 43 points. He scored four shorthanded goals which placed him in a tie for fourth in the NHL. In 1999–2000, Dvořák scored 7 goals and 17 points in 35 games before being traded. On December 30, 1999, the Panthers traded him to the San Jose Sharks in exchange for Mike Vernon and the Sharks' third-round pick in the 2000 NHL Entry Draft, after which the Sharks traded Dvořák to the New York Rangers for Todd Harvey and the Rangers' fourth-round pick in the 2001 NHL Entry Draft.

New York Rangers
Dvořák finished the 1999–2000 season with the Rangers, scoring 11 goals and 33 points in 46 games. In 2000–01, Dvořák was placed on a line with fellow Czechs Petr Nedvěd and Jan Hlavac and he would have a breakout season. In 79 games, Dvořák scored 31 goals and 36 assists for 67 points to finish fourth in team scoring. However, the Rangers would once again miss the playoffs. Dvořák saw his production fall during the 2001–02 season, scoring 17 goals and 37 points in 65 games. His production continued to fall during the 2002–03 season, as Dvořák had six goals and 27 points in 63 games with the Rangers. On March 11, 2003, the Rangers traded Dvořák and Cory Cross to the Edmonton Oilers in exchange for Anson Carter and Aleš Píša.

Edmonton Oilers
Dvořák appeared in 12 games with the Oilers in 2002–03, scoring four goals and eight points, as Edmonton qualified for the playoffs.  In his first playoff action since 1997, Dvorak scored a highlight reel goal in which he skated from end to end, scoring a game-winning goal. It would be his only point in four playoff games. Dvořák returned to the Oilers in 2003–04, where he scored 15 goals and 50 points in 78 games, however, Edmonton failed to make the playoffs. During the 2004–05 NHL lockout, Dvorak played with HC České Budějovice. He returned to the Oilers in 2005–06, where he had only eight goals and 28 points in 64 games. In the playoffs, Dvořák had two assists in 16 games, as the Oilers lost to the Carolina Hurricanes in the 2006 Stanley Cup Finals. He left the Oilers during the off-season, as he signed a one-year contract with the St. Louis Blues on September 14, 2006.

St. Louis Blues
Dvořák spent the 2006–07 season with the Blues, where in 82 games, he scored 10 goals and recorded 27 assists for 37 points. The Blues failed to qualify for the playoffs, and Dvořák left as a free agent after the season, returning to the Florida Panthers on July 1, 2007.

Florida Panthers
Dvořák returned to his original NHL team in the 2007–08 season. In 67 games with the Panthers, Dvořák had only 8 goals and 17 points. He saw his numbers rebound in the 2008–09 season, with 15 goals and 36 points in 81 games. On July 1, 2009, Dvořák signed a two-year, $3.4 million contract extension with Florida. In the 2009–10 season, he had 14 goals and 32 points in 76 games. On December 7, 2009, he played in his 1,000th NHL game against his former club, the Edmonton Oilers, at the BankAtlantic Center.

During the 2010–11 season, the Panthers honoured Dvořák for playing more career games as a Panther than anyone in franchise history on November 23 before a game against the Pittsburgh Penguins. In 53 games that year, Dvořák had 7 goals and 14 assists for 21 points.

Atlanta Thrashers
On February 28, 2011, the Panthers traded Dvořák (along with a fifth-round pick in the 2011 NHL Entry Draft) to the Atlanta Thrashers in exchange for Patrick Rissmiller and Niclas Bergfors.

Dallas Stars
On July 1, 2011, Dvořák signed a one-year, $1.5 million contract with the Dallas Stars. On December 1, 2011, Radek Dvořák recorded his 350th career assist.

Anaheim Ducks
During the 2012–13 NHL lockout, and as a free agent, Dvořák signed a contract with HC Davos of the Swiss National League A. He played in the final seven regular season games with Davos and contributed in their post-season campaign before he signed for the remainder of the shortened 2012–13 NHL season with the Anaheim Ducks on March 24, 2013.

Carolina Hurricanes
On September 3, 2013, it was announced by Carolina Hurricanes general manager Jim Rutherford that Dvořák would be invited to attend the Carolina Hurricanes' training camp. He subsequently signed a two-way contract with Carolina on October 2, 2013. He scored his first goal for the Hurricanes in the second period of a game against the Philadelphia Flyers.

Retirement
Dvořák retired from professional hockey on January 27, 2015, after 18 seasons and 1,260 games played in the NHL.

Career statistics

Regular season and playoffs

International

Transactions
July 8, 1995 — Florida Panthers 1st round draft choice, 10th overall in the 1995 NHL Entry Draft.
December 30, 1999 – Traded by the Florida Panthers to the San Jose Sharks in exchange for Mike Vernon.
December 30, 1999 – Traded by the San Jose Sharks to the New York Rangers in exchange for Todd Harvey.
March 11, 2003 – Traded by the New York Rangers, along with Cory Cross, to the Edmonton Oilers in exchange for Anson Carter and Aleš Píša.
September 14, 2006 – Signed as a free agent with the St. Louis Blues.
July 1, 2007 – Signed as a free agent with the Florida Panthers.
July 1, 2009 – Signed a two-year, $3.4 million contract extension with Florida.
February 28, 2011 – Traded by the Florida Panthers to the Atlanta Thrashers along with a fifth-round draft pick in exchange for Patrick Rissmiller and Niclas Bergfors.
July 1, 2011 – Signed a one-year contract worth $1.5 million with the Dallas Stars.
March 24, 2013 - Signed a one-year contract worth $675K with the Anaheim Ducks
October 2, 2013 - Signed a one-year contract worth $600K with the Carolina Hurricanes
January 27, 2015 - Retired from the NHL

References

External links
 

1977 births
Living people
Anaheim Ducks players
Atlanta Thrashers players
Carolina Hurricanes players
Czech ice hockey right wingers
Dallas Stars players
Edmonton Oilers players
Florida Panthers draft picks
Florida Panthers players
HC Davos players
Ice hockey players at the 2002 Winter Olympics
Motor České Budějovice players
National Hockey League first-round draft picks
New York Rangers players
Olympic ice hockey players of the Czech Republic
People from Tábor
St. Louis Blues players
Sportspeople from the South Bohemian Region
Czech expatriate ice hockey players in the United States
Czech expatriate ice hockey players in Canada
Czech expatriate ice hockey players in Switzerland